is a Japanese video game publisher currently specializing in content delivery services like Project EGG over the Internet.

Some of the titles that have been re-released include many of Compile's titles, like the Madō Monogatari games. The company has also re-released Neo Geo and MSX titles to the Virtual Console for the Wii.

Games

Project EGG
There are currently  games on this list, of which 1 title is no longer available (Hustle! Chumy for SG-1000):

See also
MSX
Neo Geo
Ryu Umemoto
Wii Virtual Console (Japan)
Wii Virtual Console (North America)
Wii Virtual Console (PAL regions)
Wii Virtual Console (South Korea)

References

External links
D4 Enterprise official website
Project EGG official website (in Japanese)
Project EGG official website (in English)
Project EGG official YouTube channel

Amusement companies of Japan
Video game companies of Japan
Video game publishers
Video game companies established in 2004
Japanese companies established in 2004